
Year 103 BC was a year of the pre-Julian Roman calendar. At the time it was known as the Year of the Consulship of Marius and Orestes (or, less frequently, year 651 Ab urbe condita) and the Second Year of Taichu. The denomination 103 BC for this year has been used since the early medieval period, when the Anno Domini calendar era became the prevalent method in Europe for naming years.

Events 
 By place 
 Roman Republic 
 Gaius Marius prepares a campaign against the Ambrones and Teutones (under king Teutobod) who are settled in Gaul. 
 Tryphon and Athenion lead the Second Servile War in Sicily.

 Judea 
 Alexander Jannaeus succeeds his brother Aristobulus I as king and high priest of Judea, until 76 BC.

 Asia 
 War of the Heavenly Horses 
After having fought their way west across arid regions, the Han expeditionary force under Li Guangli fails to capture the Dayuan city of Yucheng and returns east to the area of Dunhuang, having lost 90% of their men. 
 Emperor Wu of Han reinforces Li Guangli's army with 60,000 men, numerous horses and beasts of burden, and more than fifty high-ranking officers. Li Guangli's army then returns west.
 Han-Xiongnu War 
 Spring - After the Xiongnu Left Commander offers to kill Er Chanyu and surrender to the Han, Emperor Wu sends the Han general Zhao Ponu with an army of 20,000 to invade Xiongnu territory. When Zhao reaches the Altay Mountains, the commander's conspiracy is discovered, and after killing the commander, Er marches against Zhao but suffers an initial defeat.
 Summer - The Han army retreats south, but the Xiongnu surround them. After capturing Zhao Ponu during the night, the Xiongnu defeat and force the surrender of the Han soldiers. 
 The Xiongnu invade parts of China and unsuccessfully attack Shouxiang.

Births 
 Marcus Furius Bibaculus, Roman poet

Deaths 
 Aristobulus I, king of Judea.
 Gaius Lucilius, Roman satirist
 Khallata Naga of Anuradhapura, king of the Anuradhapura Kingdom

References